Maurice Hicks Jr. (born February 14, 1984), who goes by the stage name Uncle Reece, is an American Christian hip hop musician. He released his first album, 2014's Bold, with Obed Music Group. This was a Billboard chart breakthrough release.

Early life
Uncle Reece was born Maurice Hicks Jr. on February 14, 1984, in Savannah, Georgia, to a father who served in the military, Maurice Hicks Sr. and his mother Cecilia Anita Hicks. He loves music. He graduated from Florida State University with an Associate degree in Mathematics.

Music career
His music career started in 2012, with the release of "Until I Pass Out" single on March 1 of that year, and it charted at No. 15 on the Hot Gospel Songs chart by Billboard. His second single, "I Cant' Help Myself", would chart at No. 19 on that chart and at No. 48 on the Hot Christian Songs. His first album, Bold, came out on June 3, 2014 on his own label Obed Music. This would chart on two Billboard charts, on the Christian Albums at No. 30 and on the Top Gospel Albums at No. 9. The album received a three and a half star out of five review by Dwayne Lacy of New Release Tuesday, and it comes "highly recommend[ed]" from Daniel Cody at Wade-O Radio. Rea Melissa Davis, writes for AllHipHop, how "Uncle Reece is quite the musical melting pot. With BOLD ,Uncle Reece is not confined to the church, and there are no limits or boundaries to the way he can express his praise." He is nominated at the 30th Stellar Awards for the Rap Hip Hop Gospel CD of the Year and New Artist of the Year.

Discography

References

1984 births
Living people
African-American male rappers
African-American Christians
Musicians from Jacksonville, Florida
Musicians from Savannah, Georgia
People from Savannah, Georgia
Performers of Christian hip hop music
Rappers from Florida
Rappers from Georgia (U.S. state)
Songwriters from Florida
Songwriters from Georgia (U.S. state)
21st-century American rappers
21st-century American male musicians
African-American songwriters
21st-century African-American musicians
20th-century African-American people
American male songwriters